Iron Road is the name of:
Iron Road (film), a 2009 Canada/China television miniseries
Iron Road Railways, a former railroad company in Maine, Quebec, New Brunswick and Nova Scotia from 1994 to 2002
Iron Road Limited, an Australian iron ore exploration and mining company established in 2008
Iron Road (opera), a 2001 Canadian opera in two acts

See also
Via ferrata, the Italian words for "iron road", a kind of protected climbing route